Eupholus chevrolati is a species of beetle belonging to the  family Curculionidae.

Description
The basic colour of this quite variable species is metallic blue-green, with some transversal irregular black bands along the elytra. The blue-green colour derives from very small scales. The top of rostrum and the end of the antennae are black.

Distribution
This species can be found in Aru Islands (Indonesia)

Etymology
The name honours the French entomologist Louis Alexandre Auguste Chevrolat

References

 Universal Biological Indexer
 Eupholus chevrolati
 World Field Guide

Entiminae
Insects of Indonesia
Fauna of the Aru Islands
Fauna of the Lesser Sunda Islands
Taxa named by Félix Édouard Guérin-Méneville
Beetles described in 1830